This is a list of Mexican football transfers for the 2019 summer transfer window, grouped by club. It includes football transfers related to clubs from the Liga BBVA MX and the Ascenso MX.

Liga BBVA MX

América

In:

Out:

Atlas

In:

Out:

Atlético San Luis

In:

Out:

Cruz Azul

In:

Out:

Guadalajara

In:

Out:

Juárez

In:

Out:

León

In:

Out:

Monterrey

In:

Out:

Morelia

In:

Out:

Necaxa

In:

Out:

Pachuca

In:

Out:

Puebla

In:

Out:

Querétaro

In:

Out:

Santos Laguna

In:

Out:

Tijuana

In:

Out:

Toluca

In:

Out:

UANL

In:

Out:

UNAM

In:

Out:

Veracruz

In:

Out:

Ascenso MX

Atlante

In:

Out:

Celaya

In:

Out:

Chiapas

In:

Out:

Oaxaca

In:

Out:

Sinaloa

In:

Out:

Sonora

In:

Out:

Tampico Madero

In:

Out:

UAEM

In:

Out:

UAT

In:

Out:

UdeC

In:

Out:

UdeG

In:

Out:

Venados

In:

Out:

Zacatecas

In:

Out:

Zacatepec

In:

Out:

References 

Summer 2019
Mexico
Tran